Thelechoris is a genus of East African spiders in the family Ischnothelidae. It was first described by Ferdinand Karsch in 1881.  it contained only two species, both found in Madagascar: T. rutenbergi and T. striatipes.

References

Mygalomorphae
Mygalomorphae genera
Taxa named by Ferdinand Karsch